A number of introduced species, some of which have become invasive species, have been added to New Zealand's native flora and fauna. Both deliberate and accidental introductions have been made from the time of the first human settlement, with several waves of Polynesian people at some time before the year 1300, followed by Europeans after 1769.

Almost without exception, the introduced species have been detrimental to the native flora and fauna but some, such as farmed sheep and cows and the clover upon which they feed, now form a large part of the economy of New Zealand. Registers, lists and indexes of species that are invasive, potentially invasive, or a threat to agriculture or biodiversity are maintained by  Biosecurity New Zealand.

Animal species

Many invasive animal species are listed in schedules 5 and 6 of the Wildlife Act 1953. Those in Schedule 5 have no protection and may be killed. Those in Schedule 6 are declared to be noxious animals and subject to the Wild Animal Control Act 1977. In 2016 the New Zealand government introduced Predator Free 2050, a project to eliminate all non-native predators (such as rats, possums and stoats) by 2050.

Some of the invasive animal species are as follows.

Mammals
Brown rat or Norway rat (Rattus norvegicus)
Black rat (Rattus rattus)
Kiore (Polynesian rat)
Cat
Chamois
Common brushtail possum (Trichosurus vulpecula)
Dog
European hare
European hedgehog
 European rabbit (Oryctolagus cuniculus)
Fallow deer
Ferret (Mustela putorius furo)
Goat
Himalayan tahr
Horse (Equus ferus caballus)
 House mouse (Mus musculus)
Pig
Stoat (Mustela erminea)
Wallaby
Red deer
Sika deer
Rusa deer
Sambar deer
Whitetail deer
Wapiti (elk)
Least weasel

Reptiles
Plague skink or rainbow skink (Lampropholis delicata)

Birds
Australian magpie
Canada goose
Cirl bunting
Common myna
Common redpoll
Common starling
Dunnock
European goldfinch
European greenfinch
Mallard
Mute Swan
Rainbow lorikeet
Rook
Yellowhammer

Fish
Koi
 Gambusia affinis
Common rudd
Catfish
Brown trout

Invertebrates
Argentine ant (Linepithema humile)
Asian paddle crab (Charybdis japonica)
Asian paper wasp (Polistes chinensis)
Australian paper wasp (Polistes humilis)
Carpet sea squirt (Didemnum vexillum)
Common wasp (Vespula vulgaris)
European paper wasp (Polistes dominula)
German wasp (Vespula germanica)
Varroa mite (Varroa destructor)

Spiders
 there are 73 known introduced spiders, of which 50 are Australian, including
Philoponella congregabilis
The redback, Latrodectus hasselti,  thought to have arrived with a steel shipment in the 1980s

Plant and other non-animal species
The National Pest Plant Accord, with a listing of about 120 genus, species, hybrids and subspecies, was developed to limit the spread of plant pests. Invasive plants are classified as such on a regional basis with some plants declared as national plant pests. The Department of Conservation also lists 328 vascular plant species as environmental weeds.

Some of the better-known invasive plant species are:

Acacia species (mostly Australian) especially wattle
Acanthus - bear's breeches
Agapanthus
Arrowhead (Sagittaria sagittifolia)
Arundo donax - giant reed (or elephant grass)
Asiatic knotweed (Reynoutria japonica or Fallopia japonica)
Banana passionfruit
Blackberry
Boneseed (Chrysanthemoides monilifera)
Boxthorn (Lycium ferossimum)
Broom (Cytisus scoparius)
Buckthorn (Rhamnus alaternus)
Californian thistle (Cirsium arvense)
Cape sundew (Drosera capensis)
Cape tulip
Castor oil plant (Ricinus communis)
Christmasberry (Schinus terebinthifolius)
Climbing asparagus (Asparagus scandens)
Darwin's barberry (Berberis darwnii)
Didymosphenia geminata ("didymo" or "rock snot")
Field horsetail (Equisetum arvense)
Glyceria maxima, also called Poa aquatica
Gorse (Ulex europaeus)
Heather (Calluna vulgaris)
Japanese honeysuckle (Lonicera japonica)
Jasmine (Jasminum polyanthum)
Kahili ginger (Hedychium gardnerianum)
Lantana camara
Lodgepole pine (Pinus contorta)
Loquat (Eriobotrya japonica)
Lupin
Madeira vine (Anredera cordifolia)
Mexican daisy (Erigeron karvinskianus)
Mexican devil (Ageratina adenophora)
Mile-a-minute (Dipogon lignosus)
Mistflower (Ageratina riparia)
Morning glory  (Convolvulus)
Moth plant (Araujia sericifera)
Old man's beard (Clematis vitalba)
Oxygen weed (Egeria)
Oxygen weed (Lagarosiphon major)
Pampas grass (Cortaderia selloana)
Privet
Tree privet (Ligustrum lucidum)
Chinese privet (Ligustrum sinense)
Purple loosestrife (Lythrum salicaria)
Queen of the night (Cestrum nocturnum)
Ragwort
Rhododendron ponticum
Royal fern (Osmunda regalis)
Salix cinerea (gray willow)
Salix × fragilis (crack willow)
Scotch thistle (Onopordum acanthium)
Smilax (Asparagus asparagoides)
Sycamore (Acer pseudoplatanus)
Tradescantia fluminensis
Water pennywort (Hydrocotyle umbellata)
Woolly nightshade (Solanum mauritianum)
Yellow flag (Iris pseudacorus)

The city of Auckland has been declared to be the weediest city in the world.

See also 
 Fauna of New Zealand
 Invasive species of New Zealand origin

Animals in New Zealand 
Gypsy moths in New Zealand
Painted apple moth in New Zealand

Plants in New Zealand 
Blue morning glory in New Zealand
Wilding conifer

References

Further reading

External links
 Biosecurity New Zealand NZ Government Agency responsible for biosecurity
 New Zealand Department of Conservation - animal pests
 New Zealand Department of Conservation - plant pests (weeds)
 Searchable database on unwanted organisms at the Ministry for Primary Industries
 Information on plant pests at Weedbusters
 PestWebNZ

Publications

 
Invasive species
New Zealand